The NAACP Image Award winners for Entertainer of the Year. Entertainer of the Year is the final award presented at the ceremony.

Multiple wins

Beyoncé, Dionne Warwick, Whitney Houston and Patti LaBelle are the only four people to win the award twice.

References

NAACP Image Awards